The cusp of Carabelli, or Carabelli's tubercle, or tuberculum anomale of Georg Carabelli is a small additional cusp at the mesiopalatal line angle of maxillary first molars. This extra cusp is usually found on the secondary maxillary first molars and is rarely seen on primary maxillary second molars even less likely on other molars. This cusp is entirely absent in some individuals and present in others in a variety of forms. In some cases, the cusp of Carabelli may rival the main cusps in size. Other related forms include ridges, pits, or furrows. This additional cusp was first described in 1842 by the Hungarian Georg Carabelli (Carabelli György), the court dentist of the Austrian Emperor Franz.

The cusp of Carabelli is a heritable feature. Kraus (1951) proposed that homozygosity of a gene is responsible for a pronounced tubercle, whereas the heterozygote shows slight grooves, pits, tubercles or bulge. Later studies showed that the development of this trait is affected by multiple genes. The cusp of Carabelli is most common among Europeans (75-85% of individuals) and rarest in Pacific Islands (35-45%), although no study is referenced here to back up that claim.

Although it is sometimes referred to in textbooks as the Cusp of Carabelli, it is actually a tubercle, as it is may be made only of enamel, and may not contain dentin but never has a root underneath. It is unlikely, but entirely possible for the cusp to have a pulp horn. If the cusp is large, approaching the size of a regular cusp, then it will typically be formed of dentin and enamel.

See also
Dens evaginatus
Talon cusp
Tubercle

References

Further reading 
 Simon Hillson. 1996. Dental Anthropology. Cambridge University Press.

Parts of tooth